Frederick Ernest Cleary  (1905–1984) was a Chartered Surveyor and property entrepreneur from Crouch End, London. He was an environmentalist, conservationist and philanthropist. He was the founder of Haslemere Estates, a London-based development company, that spearheaded projects that generally went against the grain of the time(1958-1984). For example, he was involved in restoring existing buildings rather than demolishing them; he also helped find alternatives to glass and concrete edifices that were known to have a much greater environmental cost.  His philanthropic activities included the founding of two charitable trusts; The Cleary Foundation (1953) and The Bay Trust (1969), an environmental education charity. Within the City of London, he gained the pseudonym 'Flowering Fred' for his philanthropic activity in establishing, maintaining and enhancing over 150 green spaces in inner London. He was the author of three books Beauty and the Borough, I'll Do it Yesterday  and The Flowering City.

Early life 

Born 11 April 1905, in Hampstead, London, Cleary was the son of an electrical engineer.  He attended Owen's School, North London and qualified as a Chartered Surveyor at the Northern Polytechnic, Holloway in 1929. Cleary was married to Norah Cleary and had two daughters, Pauline Cleary (1931 - 2011) and Patricia Cleary (1938-Present).

Wartime career 

The role of Chartered Surveyor was a reserved occupation during the war and Cleary also contributed to the war effort in London as an ARP Warden.  During this time, he worked at The London Investment & Mortgage Company as a Chartered Surveyor.

Post-war career
Following the war Cleary co-founded the City & Metropolitan Building Society and remained its Chairman for the subsequent 30 years. He also joined Hornsey Council. One example of this work included The Grove Lodge Gardens in Muswell Hill. In 1949, Cleary and the Town Clerk managed to buy the land for Haringey Council and turned it into a little park. Grove Lodge Gardens featured in his book Beauty and the Borough. In this Cleary writes:

“The fence has gone, revealing the full beauty of very fine trees. The opportunities and the natural beauty of the site have been well used by intelligent planning and artistic garden designing.”

Environmentally focused on his work at Hornsey Borough Council, Cleary encouraged recycling.  In his autobiography, I’ll do it yesterday, he writes about what people refer to as waste and the efforts of residents in Hornsey Borough to continue to salvage, repurpose and recycle as much as they can.

I pointed out that in the financial year 1950-51 alone, the 100,000 residents in Hornsey Borough had salvaged 1,550 tons of paper, 1,529 tons of kitchen waste, and 436 tons of metal and other items. Had it not been for the Borough's tremendous efforts during the salvage drive, the Council's estimates would have been exceeded by more than five thousand pounds.

Cleary founded the Cleary Foundation in 1953 (initially named the ‘Cleary Charitable Trust’). The aims of the foundation have been to assist charities involved in education, the arts, conservation and the natural environment. For the most part, the causes supported are located in South East Kent.

For over thirty years, from the early 1950s onwards, Cleary became a leading light in the provision of many gardens and open spaces provided by the Corporation of the City of London and others, resulting in his nickname ‘Flowering Fred’.

Property renovation 

Cleary established the company Haslemere Estates before the war with the purpose of undertaking renovations of houses. The name was taken from 'Haslemere Road' in Crouch End, near where he lived. Until 1958, Haslemere Estates was modestly active. However, in 1958 Cleary retired from the London and Investment Mortgage Company and focussed his time and energy on Haslemere Estates with the support of Frank Collier and Hilda Lupton. The Company flourished and with a growing board of Directors, including David Pickford (Managing Director) the company went public in 1961. The company continued to prosper over the subsequent 25 years before being acquired by Rodamco (part of the Dutch asset management group, Robeco) in 1986. ‘Haslemere’ specialised in restoring the integrity and elegance of period buildings, while simultaneously allowing for the considerations of the modern occupiers of such property. Cleary was ahead of his time in seeking to restore the old, rather than demolish it. His influence was such that before long ‘Doing a Haslemere’ became the term coined in the property world for formidable restoration projects. The work of Haslemere was lauded equally by both property developers and preservationists. Lord Duncan Sandys President and Founder of The Civic Trust wrote about Haslemere Estates saying:

"No company has done more than Haslemere Estates to preserve our irreplaceable architectural heritage by the restoration of old buildings and their adaptation to present day uses. In a striking manner, Haslemere Estates have proved beyond doubt that commercial interests and architectural conservation are by no means incompatible, and can, in fact, be complementary."

Contributions to London's parks and gardens 

Cleary was a member of the Court of Common Council from 1959 to 1984 and was for three decades also Chairman of The Corporation of the City of London's Trees Gardens and Open Spaces Committee and the Metropolitan Public Gardens Association.  In these roles, he was instrumental in creating green and restful spaces in the city, often on the site of bomb-damaged sites. Over 150 gardens within The City of London were transformed and maintained during his leadership, creating natural beauty out of war-torn scars and neglected spaces. Examples of ‘scars of yesterday being turned into the gardens of today’ are illustrated in Fred's books Beauty and the Borough and The Flowering City.

In 1982, to mark their centenary, the Metropolitan Public Gardens Association funded the laying out of Cleary Garden, EC4, Huggin Hill.

Life in East Kent 

Since his boyhood days, Cleary had visited the Kent Coast, his father having served in Dover during the First World War. St. Margaret's Bay had been a regular fixture during school holidays and made a great impression on the young Fred, to the extent that by the late 1940s he and his wife Norah became resident here. It was perhaps inevitable that Cleary would leave his mark locally, stepping in to acquire and preserve local land and buildings including Crabble Corn Mill near Dover and The Landmark Centre in Deal. Fred's most significant legacy in Kent was in establishing the foundations of The Bay Trust (The St Margaret's Bay Trust) in 1969, a charity committed to 'preserving the natural environment in the proximity of St. Margaret's Bay and undertaking related environmental education initiatives'. The Bay Trust continues this work to the present day. In 1975 Cleary purchased and refurbished (through the Cleary Foundation) an old rectory building ('Ripple Down House') in Ringwould. The site became an environmental education centre for children known as Rippledown now run and managed by The Bay Trust. The Bay Museum (later St Margaret's Museum) was opened in August 1989, where much of the collection of local maritime artefacts were collected by Cleary during his life.

Awards 
Cleary was awarded an MBE (1951) and CBE (1979) in acknowledgement of his environmental and philanthropic activities. In 1976 Cleary was made an honorary fellow of Magdalene College, Cambridge where he funded the restoration of the Pepys Library and the Cleary Research Fellowship award (which remains available to Land Economy students studying at the College).
In 1981 he was awarded the Veitch Memorial Medal by the Royal Horticultural Society in recognition of his services to Gardening in the City of London and elsewhere.

References 

1984 deaths
1905 births
English surveyors
People from Crouch End
Commanders of the Order of the British Empire
Civil Defence Service personnel
People from Dover District